Happy Frame of Mind is an album by American jazz pianist Horace Parlan featuring performances recorded for Blue Note in 1963, but not released under Parlan's name on the label until 1986. The session was originally released under Booker Ervin's name in 1976 as part of the Blue Note 2-LP set Back from the Gig and later released as originally intended. The album was first released on a CD in 1995.

Reception
The Allmusic review by Stephen Thomas Erlewine awarded the album 4½ stars and stated: "Happy Frame of Mind finds Horace Parlan breaking away from the soul-inflected hard bop that had become his trademark, moving his music into more adventurous, post-bop territory... it's one of Parlan's most successful efforts, finding the perfect middle ground between accessible, entertaining jazz and more adventurous music."

Track listing
 "Home Is Africa" (Ronnie Boykins) - 6:14
 "A Tune for Richard" (Booker Ervin) - 5:44
 "Back from the Gig" (Parlan) - 5:58
 "Dexi" (Johnny Coles) - 5:57
 "Kucheza Blues" (Randy Weston) - 6:10
 "Happy Frame of Mind" (Parlan) - 8:49

Personnel
Horace Parlan - piano
Johnny Coles - trumpet
Booker Ervin - tenor saxophone
Grant Green - guitar (#1-4, 6)
Butch Warren - bass
Billy Higgins - drums

References

Blue Note Records albums
Horace Parlan albums
1986 albums
Albums recorded at Van Gelder Studio
Albums produced by Alfred Lion